Islander, Islanders, or The Islanders may refer to:

People
 Islander, referring to Jersey people
 Islander, New Zealand-English term usually meaning Pacific Islander

Arts, entertainment, and media

Literature
 The Islander (Rylant novel), 1998 children's fantasy novel by Cynthia Rylant
 The Islander, 1962 novel by Allan Campbell McLean  Niven Award 
 The Islander, 2012 translation by Seán Ó Coileáin of the 1929 Irish autobiography of Tomas O'Crohan
 The Islanders (Nikolai Leskov novel), 1866 Russian novel (Островитяне)
 The Islanders (Christopher Priest novel), 2011 British science fiction novel
 The Islandman, 1937 translation by Robin Flower of Tomas O'Crohan's autobiography

Film and television
 Islander (film), a 2006 film directed by Ian McCrudden
 The Islanders (TV series), an adventure television series from 1960 to 1961
 The Islander, a 1978 TV film directed by Paul Krasny

Music

Groups
 Islander (band), American rock/post-hardcore band
 The Islanders (American band), fl. 1959
 Danny and the Islanders, a Finnish group
 Jon Lilygreen and the Islanders, see Cyprus in the Eurovision Song Contest 2010

Albums
 Islander (album), 2014 recording by Jarle Bernhoft
 Islanders (album), an album by York
 The Islander (album), 1998 recording by Dave Dobbyn

Songs
 "The Islander" (song), a 2007 song by Nightwish
 "Islander", a song by Ionnalee from her 2019 album Remember the Future

Periodicals
 The Islander (Australian newspaper), published on Kangaroo Island since 1967
 The Islander, a Prince Edward Island newspaper founded in 1842 in Canada
 The Islander, the only newspaper of Ascension Island
 The Islander, a newspaper in Massachusetts that began in 1840
 The Islander, Anna Maria Island, Florida
 The Islander, newspaper published in North Hero, Vermont since 1974
 The Islander, a Victoria, British Columbia newspaper started in 1952

Other uses in arts, entertainment, and media
 Islanders (video game), a 2019 video game by Grizzly Games
 Adventure Island (video game), known in India as Islander

Boats
Islander 21, an American sailboat design
Islander 24, an American sailboat design
Islander 24 Bahama, an American sailboat design
Islander 36, an American sailboat design
Islander 40, an American sailboat design
Islander (steamboat), active in the early 1900s on Puget Sound
Islander (yawl), the second boat sailed around the world single-handedly
MV Islander, a ferry on Vineyard Sound
SS Islander, a sunken ship that once carried Klondike gold

Sports
 Harrisburg City Islanders, an American soccer team later known as Penn FC, 2003–2019
 Islanders FC, a British Virgin Islands football club
 New York Islanders, professional hockey team in the NHL
 Bridgeport Islanders, professional hockey team in the AHL
 Pacific Islanders rugby union team, 2004–2008
 Puerto Rico Islanders, football club in Puerto Rico, 2003–2012
 Texas A&M–Corpus Christi Islanders, an athletic program
 The Islanders (professional wrestling), 1986–1988
 The Wild Samoans, a professional wrestling tag team known at various times during the 1970s as The Islanders

Other uses
 Islander (database) integrative islands in prokaryotic genomes
 Britten-Norman Islander, a twin-engine light aircraft
 Islander Hotel, Papua New Guinea